Maryport is a town and civil parish in the Allerdale borough of Cumbria, England, historically in Cumberland.

The town is situated just outside the Lake District National Park, at the northern end of the former Cumberland Coalfield.

Location

It's one of the southernmost towns on the Solway Firth, where the River Ellen skirts the grounds of Netherhall School before flowing through Maryport into the Solway Firth.

Maryport railway station is on the Cumbrian Coast Line.

History

Prehistoric times 
Evidence for Final Palaeolithic and Mesolithic occupation was found at Netherhall Road. This was the first located archaeological evidence of tuff exploitation in the Lake District.

Roman and medieval times

The town was established around 122 as one of several Roman localities called Alauna. It was a command and supply base for the coastal defences at the western extremity of Hadrian's Wall. The town contains substantial remains of the Roman fort, which was the last in a series that stretched southwards along the coast from the wall to prevent it being avoided by crossing the Solway Firth. Geomagnetic surveys have revealed a large Roman town surrounding the fort. An archaeological dig discovered evidence of an earlier, larger fort next to, and partially under the present remains. After the Roman withdrawal from Britain the town would have diminished in size and importance without a military presence.

The Senhouse Roman Museum adjoins the site of Alauna, and has a replica wooden watch-tower overlooking the fort and the sea. The museum houses a remarkable collection of 17 Roman altars found at the site, believed to be one of the finest such collections in the whole Roman Empire.

On Castle Hill are the earthworks and buried remains of a 12th-century motte-and-bailey castle. On the summit are the foundations of a World War II gun emplacement.

To the north are the ruins of Netherhall Estate. The only remains of this once grand manor are stables and a 14th-century pele tower, largely built of dressed Roman stones presumably from Alauna Roman fort nearby. The tower was formerly part of a large house of later date which was demolished in 1979 following a fire.

Georgian times
For many years the town was named Ellenfoot but the name was changed by Humphrey Senhouse as he began developing the town as a port, following the example of Whitehaven. In 1749 an Act of Parliament was passed to allow the creation of the present town. Humphrey Senhouse named the new town after his wife Mary. The Senhouse family were landowners in the area and responsible for the development of the town and excavation of its Roman past. The family also had interests in the West Indies. In 1770, Humphrey Senhouse's son, William, was appointed Surveyor General of Customs in Barbados where he purchased a sugar plantation and managed another for Sir James Lowther of Whitehaven. William's brother, Joseph, had a coffee plantation in Dominica. Both men were considerable slave-owners.

It was during this period that the town's lighthouse was built.

Victorian times
The town quickly developed as an industrial centre throughout the 19th century. An iron foundry opened and the port developed as did shipyards, such as Wood's yard and Ritson's yard, which was famous for launching ships broadside into the River Ellen because it was not wide enough to allow ships to be launched the usual way. By this time, coal mines were operating all around the town, at Ellenborough, Dearham, Broughton Moor, Gilcrux and Birkby.

The Maryport and Carlisle Railway, opened in the 1840s, with George Stephenson as its engineer, made the transport of coal much easier. Large new mines were sunk in the Aspatria area and almost all their production passed through the port. In 1846, 213,152 tons of coal were shipped from Maryport and by 1857 this had risen to more than 340,000 tons.
Much of the coal produced in the area was turned into coke for the local iron and steel industry. By 1890, the Allerdale Coal Company had thirty Beehive coke ovens working on its site at Buckhill, Broughton Moor.

In 1874, the owners announced a cut of 10% in the miners' wages. A strike began in the Aspatria pits and then the owners made a further cut of 15%. By December, the strike had spread to the whole area with 2,000 men involved. The strike lasted until March 1875. There was violence when some 'blacklegs' were assaulted and many colliers left the area to seek work elsewhere.
In 1894, John Osmaston who operated the Dearham Colliery became insolvent and the bank took over his pits. Two groups of local miners formed co-operatives and leased the mines at Crosshow and Townhead from the Lowthers. They found it impossible to compete with the other wealthy coal-owners in a tight market and also had serious problems with drainage. This unique experiment ended in 1903 when both companies went into liquidation.

Modern times
During the early years of the 20th century, trade in the docks remained steady but was badly affected by the 1926 General Strike. Then, in 1927, a new deep-water dock was opened in Workington. Previously, the Workington Iron and Steel works had imported much of their raw material through Maryport but all of this trade was immediately transferred to the new facility. The local Solway Blast Furnaces also closed.

Maryport became a ghost town. The government declared West Cumberland a ‘Special Area' but, by 1933, 57.3% of the town's insured workforce was unemployed. 1,684 men were out of work. Maryport was “for the most part, living on public funds”. In 1936 twenty unemployed men marched from Maryport to join the Jarrow Crusade to London. Known as the Maryport Marchers, they were joined by two marchers from Cleator Moor and two marchers from Frizington. The Maryport Marchers Council organised this.

Despite a minor boom during the Second World War, when coal from North East England was diverted to the port, Maryport never recovered. The docks were closed to cargo ships in the 1960s. The last deep pit in the area, at Risehow, closed in 1966 and open-cast mining ended in 2000.

Today, after a series of major regeneration projects such as the yacht marina in the local harbour, prospects for the town are starting to look better. It is expected that tourism will play a major role in the future of the town.

In October 2018, it was announced that the Netherhall School community swimming pool was to close.

Maryport Lighthouse

The town has a small lighthouse, formerly run by Trinity House, the general lighthouse authority for England. It is a Grade II listed building.

In 2010 Trinity House transferred responsibility for the new light to the Maryport Harbour Authority. The old lighthouse was restored and repainted in 2017 as part of a government-funded initiative for the refurbishment of seaside towns.

Governance
The town is part of the parliamentary constituency of Workington. In the December 2019 general election, the Tory candidate for Workington, Mark Jenkinson, was elected the MP, overturning a 9.4 per cent Labour majority from the 2017 election to eject shadow environment secretary Sue Hayman by a margin of 4,136 votes. Until the December 2019 general election The Labour Party has won the seat in the constituency in every general election since 1979.The Conservative Party has only been elected once in Workington since World War II, at the 1976 by-election. The town historically has been a Labour supporting area.

Before Brexit, it was in the North West England European Parliamentary Constituency.

For Local Government purposes it is in both the Maryport North Ward and the Maryport South Ward of Allerdale Borough Council and the Maryport North Division and the  Maryport South Division of Cumbria County Council.

Maryport has its own parish council, Maryport Town Council.

Economy
The economy of the area and the emergence of the industrial capacity of the town itself developed largely because of mining and sea trade, but these industries have since declined and the town now relies on tourism as the basis of its economy. There is an aquarium, a maritime museum and a Roman museum. The last houses numerous Roman artefacts, most notably a series of altars to Jupiter Optimus Maximus, which were excavated in the vicinity of the Roman fort. In July 2008, a new tourism venue, the Wave Centre, opened its doors. The Wave Centre is a theatre and conference facility, an interactive heritage exhibition on the local history of Maryport, the Tourist Information Centre for Maryport and a gift shop and bistro.

The town has two industrial estates, the Glasson Industrial Estate and the Solway Industrial Estate, which are home to many small local businesses. It was formerly home to a factory belonging to the Bata company which closed in the early 1980s.

Culture
The town is a major name on the blues music scene, holding the "Maryport Blues Festival" every summer. This has previously attracted names such as Jools Holland, Dionne Warwick, Elkie Brooks, Buddy Guy, Jethro Tull, Van Morrison, Robert Cray and Chuck Berry.
The three-day event usually takes place on the last weekend of July, attracting both local and international artists. The 2018 Maryport Blues Festival was cancelled.

Maryport also holds the annual Taste of The Sea food festival where visitors can enjoy food from all over Cumbria, such as Rum Butter and Kendal Mint Cake.

The town has a Scout Group (2nd Maryport) that has been in the town for over 70 years and incorporates most sections within the Scouting Movement. The group was visited by the Bishop of Carlisle to mark the centenary of Scouting in 2008.

The town also has a Girl Guiding Group, a Young Archaeology Society, and a local wildlife conservation society. 

Maryport Golf Club, a 18-hole course, was formed on 21 January 1905.

Education
Maryport has five local primary schools, and one secondary school, Netherhall School.

Notable people

 Dan Bewley , speedway rider,
Fletcher Christian, mutineer on HMS Bounty,
Douglas Clark, rugby league player,
Jack Connor, footballer,
Kyle Dempsey, footballer,
Isabella Harris, mother of Lord Lister who invented the post-op antiseptic process,
William Harrison Merchant Navy Officer, and first Captain of Brunel's SS Great Eastern,
Mark Heron, musician,
Dick Huddart, rugby league player,
Thomas Henry Ismay, founder of the White Star Line shipping company
Ricky Lightfoot, world champion trail runner,
James Lomas, rugby league player,
Dave McCracken, songwriter, music producer, programmer, mixer and remixer,
Seán Milroy, Irish revolutionary and politician,
Glenn Murray, footballer,
Ike Southward, rugby league player,
Edward Benn Smith, recipient of the Victoria Cross,
Tom Smith, footballer,
George Tosh, engineer and metallurgist.

See also

Listed buildings in Maryport

References

Further reading
Biggins, J.A. and Taylor, D.J.A., 2004b, "The Roman Fort and Vicus at Maryport: Geophysical Survey, 2000–2004", in R.J.A. Wilson and I, Caruana (eds.), Romans on the Solway, CWAAS for the Trustees of the Senhouse Museum, Maryport, 102–133.

External links

Cumbria County History Trust: Maryport (nb: provisional research only - see Talk page)

Index of Maryport Sailing Ships
article on the Maritime Museum
Maryport local information and news website
iRomans Link to a website showing a selection of Roman objects from Maryport stored with collection at Tullie House Museum.
Senhouse family in the West Indies

 
120s establishments in the Roman Empire
Roman sites in Cumbria
Roman fortifications in England
Towns in Cumbria
Populated coastal places in Cumbria
Civil parishes in Cumbria
Allerdale
Roman auxiliary forts in England